Balaives-et-Butz is a former commune in the Ardennes department in the Grand Est region of northern France. On 1 January 2019, it was merged into the commune Flize.

The inhabitants of the commune are known as Balaiviens or Balaiviennes.

The commune has been awarded two flowers by the National Council of Towns and Villages in Bloom in the Competition of cities and villages in Bloom.

Geography
Balaives-et-Butz is located an est. 10 km south of Charleville-Mézières, and 5 km north-east of Poix-Terron. Access to the commune is by the D233 road from Boutancourt in the east, which passes through the south-eastern branch of the commune just south of the village then continues south-west to Singly. The village is accessed by the Rue du Routon which branches off the D233. The commune has large areas of forest with comparatively small areas of farmland.

The Ruisseau de Butz rises west of the village and flow east through the village then eastwards to join the Étang d'Alger and the Ruisseau de Boutancourt which eventually joins the Meuse at Flize. The Ruisseau de Bourbeuse rises south of the village and joins the Ruisseau de Butz in the village.

Neighbouring communes and villages

History
The name Balaives means "beautiful water" from the nearby water sources.

Heraldry

Administration

List of Successive Mayors

Demography
In 2012 the commune had 227 inhabitants.

Sites and monuments
A Fulling Water Mill (currently a Vynex Hardware factory) (18th century) is registered as an historical monument.

See also
Communes of the Ardennes department

References

External links

Balaives-et-Butz on the old National Geographic Institute website 
Vynex website  (largest employer in the canton)
Baleyre and But on the 1750 Cassini Map

Former communes of Ardennes (department)
Populated places disestablished in 2019